WBBH-TV (channel 20) is a television station licensed to Fort Myers, Florida, United States, serving as the NBC affiliate for Southwest Florida. It is the lone broadcast station owned by locally-based Waterman Broadcasting, which provides certain services to Naples-licensed ABC affiliate WZVN-TV (channel 26, cable 7) under a local marketing agreement (LMA) with Montclair Communications. Both stations share studios on Central Avenue in Fort Myers, while WBBH-TV's transmitter is located along SR 31 in unincorporated southeastern Charlotte County. The station is known as NBC 2, reflecting its primary channel number on local cable television systems.

WBBH-TV went on the air in December 1968 as the second station in Fort Myers; it has been an NBC affiliate since its first day on air. Waterman Broadcasting has owned WBBH since 1979, when it purchased the station from its original owners; WBBH took over most of the operations of what is now WZVN-TV in 1994. It has generally fought CBS affiliate WINK-TV for first place in local news ratings.

History

Buerry, Burgess, and Hoffman: Early years
In 1967, two companies petitioned the Federal Communications Commission (FCC) to add channels in the ultra high frequency (UHF) band to the table of usable TV channels in Fort Myers. Acting on the proposals from Kenneth Schwartz and Hubbard Broadcasting, the FCC allotted channel 20 in January 1968. That May, Broadcasting-Telecasting Services, Inc., headed by former WMYR sales director and announcer Joseph Buerry Jr., applied for channel 20, proposing a station with a more intensive focus on local news than the only existing station in town, CBS affiliate WINK-TV (channel 11). No other group applied, and Broadcasting-Telecasting Services received a construction permit in July. It announced its intention to be a primary NBC affiliate with a secondary ABC affiliation. Buerry, along with investors Jackson Burgess and Howard Hoffman (also formerly of WMYR), gave the station its call letters—WBBH-TV.

The studios were finished by the start of December, with erection of the station's transmitting tower in Lehigh Acres in progress. The station began broadcasting on December 18, 1968, displacing WFLA-TV of Tampa and WCKT of Miami on local cable systems and a Fort Myers-area translator as the source of NBC programming in Southwest Florida.

After nearly six years, Buerry resigned as president in August 1974; he had been visible on air presenting station editorials. Hoffman became the general manager at a time when the station was suffering financially, though it had begun to turn a profit in 1972. The station lost ABC programs to a new station in Naples, WEVU (channel 26), at this time as well.

Sale to Waterman
In 1978, Waterman Broadcasting Corporation, which at the time only owned two radio stations in San Antonio, Texas, began negotiating to buy WBBH-TV after the stockholders of Broadcasting-Telecasting Services opted to put the station on the market. A sale agreement was reached in April 1979. Waterman activated a new tower in 1983; the station began broadcasting at the UHF maximum effective radiated power of five million watts and improved its signal in the northern part of its coverage area. In 1987, an expansion was completed to the Central Avenue studio; the original,  building was wrapped around a two-story building with an internal atrium.

Waterman Broadcasting began to search for ways to expand the station in the early 1990s. It first thought it had an agreement with WNPL-TV (channel 46) to program the second station under a time brokerage agreement. However, WNPL was in turmoil at the time. The agreement was reached during a period in which the station manager left; he then came back and ignored the agreement, with station officials calling the issue a misunderstanding. Waterman then sued WNPL, which in turn filed for bankruptcy protection.

On June 1, 1994, Ellis Communications, the owner of WEVU, entered into a local marketing agreement with WBBH-TV, which began providing the station's news programming. Some WEVU staffers were not retained by WBBH; in all, there were 20 firings, including WEVU's main news, weather and sports anchors. That September, WBBH began branding as channel 2 after its position on local cable systems; WEVU did likewise with channel 7 and changed its call sign to WZVN-TV the next year. 

Ellis Communications merged with Raycom Media in 1996; under a deal previously made by Ellis, WZVN-TV's license was sold to Montclair Communications, which continued the LMA with WBBH. Montclair was founded by Lara Kunkler, station manager for WBBH and WZVN and the goddaughter of Bernie Waterman, owner of Waterman Broadcasting. The deal allowed a once-unprofitable station to become profitable. In 2001, Waterman attempted to merge with Montclair by way of a stock swap. However, instead of allowing the deal, the FCC let the application languish; at one point, it ordered it unwound by 2004.

News operation
WINK-TV, which had been the only local station prior to channel 20 signing on the air, remained the news leader in the market until 1974, when WBBH rose to the top and provided serious competition for WINK. However, by the early 1980s, it had slipped behind WINK, though it was well ahead of WEVU, whose news ratings were typically anemic. Beginning in January 1994, WBBH experimented with producing newscasts for air on local cable systems' local origination channels: these included 7 p.m., 10 p.m., and midnight broadcasts branded as the Eyewitness News Network.

In the wake of the WEVU LMA in 1994, equipment investments were made for the joint operation. WBBH–WZVN had the market's first Doppler weather radar installed in the mid-1990s, and in 1997, a studio expansion was completed allowing both stations to present simultaneous 11 p.m. newscasts. The stations have dedicated anchors but share reporters; during major hurricane coverage, the stations have often aired a single telecast using their combined news and weather resources. Despite the shared resources, news viewership has tilted strongly toward WBBH—which continues to compete with WINK for first—over WZVN.

In 2018, the Waterman stations cut back their sports department; weeknight sportscasts were eliminated, along with the position of sports director for WBBH-TV. That same year, WBBH added a 3 p.m. newscast, giving it three and a half straight hours of local news leading into the NBC Nightly News.

Notable former on-air staff
 Gene Lavanchy — sports anchor, 1986–1988
 John Muller – reporter
 Susan Rook — reporter, early 1980s
 Shepard Smith – reporter, late 1980s–1992
 Ukee Washington — sports anchor, 1981—1987

Technical information

Subchannels
The station's digital signal is multiplexed:

Analog-to-digital conversion
On October 31, 2002, WZVN-TV and WBBH-TV began broadcasting high-definition television, the first stations in the market to do so. The conversion to digital required the construction of a new tower, as the 1983-built mast did not meet more stringent wind loading requirements.

WBBH-TV discontinued regular programming on its analog signal, over UHF channel 20, on February 17, 2009, the original date in which full-power television stations in the United States were to transition from analog to digital broadcasts under federal mandate (which was later pushed back to June 12, 2009). As part of the SAFER Act, WBBH-TV kept its analog signal on the air until February 21 to inform viewers of the digital television transition through a loop of public service announcements from the National Association of Broadcasters. The station's digital signal remained on its pre-transition UHF channel 15, using virtual channel 20.

WBBH-TV broadcast WZVN-TV from its transmitter between October 2019 and March 2020 while repack work was conducted on that station's own transmitter equipment.

See also
 Channel 2 branded TV stations in the United States
 Channel 15 digital TV stations in the United States
 Channel 20 virtual TV stations in the United States

Notes

References

External links
 WBBH-TV "NBC 2"
 Waterman Broadcasting Corporation

NBC network affiliates
Television channels and stations established in 1968
BBH-TV
1968 establishments in Florida
Heroes & Icons affiliates